Pinto is an unincorporated community in Washington County, Utah, United States.  It was established in 1856 by Rufus C. Allen and other leaders of the LDS Southern Indian Mission so they could move away from Fort Harmony, Utah and John D. Lee's attempts to usurp their authority.

References

External links
 
 PINTO, UTAH from wchsutah.org WASHINGTON COUNTY HISTORICAL SOCIETY (Washington County, Utah) accessed December 9, 2015.

Populated places established in 1856
Unincorporated communities in Washington County, Utah
Unincorporated communities in Utah
1856 establishments in Utah Territory